Annimycin (4-(Z)-annimycin) is a polyenoic acid amide natural product produced by Streptomyces calvus. Annimycin inhibits the sporulation of several actinobacterial genera.

Biosynthesis 
All of the genes necessary for the biosynthesis of annimycin are contained within a single 35 kb cluster. The biosynthetic structural genes, summarized in figure 2. consist of five open reading frames encoding the biosynthesis of the C5N group (ann1, ann2 and ann3 genes) and the polyenoic acid (genes ann4 and ann5). The genes ann4 and ann5 encode two polypeptides that correspond to a type 1 polyketide synthase PKS.

The biosynthesis of the C5N ring was recently reconstructed. The ann2 gene encode for a 5-aminolevulinate synthase which condenses glycine and succinyl-CoA in a Claisen-like reaction to form 5-aminolevulinate. The ann3 gene produces acyl-CoA ligase and is predicted to activate 5-aminolevulinate as the CoA thioester, which subsequently undergo intramolecular cyclization with a carbanion generated at C5 to form C5N. The ann2 product is predicted to catalyze this cyclization using pyridoxyl phosphate to stabilize the carbanion. The gene ann1 encode for an  ATP-dependent amide synthetase and is predicted to condense the amine of the C5N group with the polyenoic acid product forming annimycin.

Genes ann4 and ann5 are the polyketide synthase part of the biosynthesis. Gene ann4 is organized in four modules, including the loading module, loading a propionyl unit, the sequences of the AT (acyltransferase) domain modules 1-3 are predicted to load malonyl and methylmalonyl extender units. The ann5 gene product is organized in modules 4 a 5, the latter terminating with a thioesterase domain.

One of the most interesting things about this biosynthetic pathway is the presence of the Z stereochemistry in the C4/C5 double bond. This feature is not very commonly seen in polyketides. More over module 5 contains a dehydratase (DH) domain that is not functional.

References 

Carboxamides
Cyclopentenes
Alcohols
Polyunsaturated compounds